The Free State of Mecklenburg-Strelitz was a state of the Weimar Republic established in 1918 following the German Revolution which had overthrown the Grand Duchy of Mecklenburg-Strelitz. The state lasted until the Nazi Party (NSDAP) came to power in Germany and merged the state with the neighbouring Free State of Mecklenburg-Schwerin to form a united state of Mecklenburg on 1 January, 1934.

Government
The state parliament consisted of a landtag of 35 members, elected for a term of four years by universal suffrage. The state administration, headed by a Minister of State was responsible to the landtag and could be removed by a vote of no confidence. For most of the Weimar period, the governments were headed by either a Social Democrat or a Nationalist. 

However, following the Nazi seizure of power at the national level, they enacted the "Second Law on the Coordination of the States with the Reich" which established more direct control over the states by means of the new powerful position of Reichsstatthalter (Reich Governor). Friedrich Hildebrandt was installed in this post on 26 May 1933. He immediately moved to take full control of the state apparatus by the appointment of a fellow-Nazi, Fritz Stichtenoth, as Minister of State on 29 May 1933.

By the end of the year, Hildebrandt, who was also Reichsstatthalter of the larger neighboring Free State of Mecklenburg-Schwerin, moved to consolidate his domains and merged the two states into a new united state of Mecklenburg, effective 1 January 1934. And with that, the brief fifteen-year existence of the Free State of Mecklenburg-Strelitz passed into history.

Rulers of Mecklenburg-Strelitz

Chairmen of the State Ministry of Mecklenburg-Strelitz, 1918–1919
Peter Franz Stubmann (DDP) 1918–1919
Hans Krüger (SPD) 1919

Minister-Presidents of Mecklenburg-Strelitz, 1919–1933
Karl Gustav Hans Otto Freiherr von Reibnitz (SPD) 1919–1923
Karl Schwabe (DNVP) 1923–1928
Karl Gustav Hans Otto Freiherr von Reibnitz (SPD) 1928–1931
Heinrich Wilhelm Ferdinand von Michael (DNVP) 1931–1933
Fritz Stichtenoth (NSDAP) 1933

Reichsstatthalter
Friedrich Hildebrandt 1933

See also
 Mecklenburg-Strelitz Landtag elections in the Weimar Republic

References

External links
States of Germany since 1918
Promulgation of the union of Mecklenburg-Strelitz with Mecklenburg-Schwerin, effective 1 January 1934

1918 establishments in Germany
1933 disestablishments in Germany
Free State of Mecklenburg-Strelitz
States of the Weimar Republic